Hampden Township is the largest municipality by population in Cumberland County, Pennsylvania, United States. The population was 28,044 at the 2010 census, up from 24,135 at the 2000 census.

History
The Johannes Eberly House was added to the National Register of Historic Places in 1973.

Geography
Hampden Township is located in northeastern Cumberland County, drained by Conodoguinet Creek, which makes several large bends across the middle of the township on its way east towards the Susquehanna River. Blue Mountain separates the township in the north from Perry County. Its villages include Brennemans Mill, Good Hope, Mount Zion, and Sporting Hill.

Interstate 81 crosses the northern part of the township, with access from Exit 61 (Pennsylvania Route 944) at Mount Zion. Pennsylvania Route 581, the southwestern segment of Harrisburg's Capital Beltway, interchanges with I-81 in the west and runs south then east across the township, with access from Exit 2 (Creekview Road), Exit 3 (Carlisle Pike/U.S. Route 11), and Exit 4 (Pennsylvania Route 641).

Adjacent municipalities
East Pennsboro Township (east)
Camp Hill (southeast)
Lower Allen Township (south)
Shiremanstown (south)
Mechanicsburg (southwest)
Silver Spring Township (west)
Rye Township, Perry County (north)

Climate
The township has a hot-summer humid continental climate (Dfa) and the hardiness zones are 7a and 6b. Annual monthly average temperatures in Sporting Hill range from 29.9 °F in January to 74.8 °F in July.  The annual absolute minimum temperature in Sporting Hill is 0.3 °F.

Demographics
At the 2020 census there were 32,761 people, 11,779 households living in the township.  The population density was 1,558 people per square mile (524.4/km).  There were 12,261 housing units at an average density of 681.1/sq mi (217.1/km).  The racial makeup of the township was 88.9% White, 1.7% African American, 0.1% Native American, 7.1% Asian, 0.0% Pacific Islander, 0.6% from other races, and 0.2% from two or more races. Hispanic or Latino of any race were 2.0%.

There were 11,470 households, 29.9% had children under the age of 18 living with them, 59.7% were married couples living together, 7.1% had a female householder with no husband present, and 30.3% were non-families. 25.4% of households were made up of individuals, and 9.5% were one person aged 65 or older.  The average household size was 2.44 and the average family size was 2.94.

The age distribution was 23.2% under the age of 18, 9.6% from 18 to 24, 25.2% from 25 to 44, 31.2% from 45 to 64, and 15.1% 65 or older.  The median age was 42.6 years. For every 100 females, there were 93.4 males.  For every 100 females age 18 and over, there were 92.4 males.

The median household income was $85,284 and the median family income  was $105,121. Males had a median income of $62,566 versus $51,473 for females. The per capita income for the township was $42,955.  About 1.2% of families and 3.6% of the population were below the poverty line, including 2.6% of those under age 18 and 3.1% of those age 65 or over.

Government and infrastructure
Hampden Township became a first class township on Jan 1, 1960.

The Pennsylvania Department of Corrections has its headquarters in the township.

Education
Hampden Township is served by the Cumberland Valley School District.  
 Silver Spring Elementary
 Middlesex Elementary
 Hampden Elementary
 Monroe Elementary
 Green Ridge Elementary
 Shaull Elementary
 Sporting Hill Elementary
 Winding Creek Elementary
 Eagle View Middle School
 Mountain View Middle School
 Cumberland Valley High School

Parks and recreation
Hampden Pool and Park
Creekview Recreation Area
Salem Community Park
Conodoguinet Youth Park

The township also manages Armitage Golf Club, a 70-par course located along Orrs Bridge Road.

Other parks
Indian Creek Park
Pinebrook Neighborhood Park

References

External links

Hampden Township official website

Harrisburg–Carlisle metropolitan statistical area
Townships in Cumberland County, Pennsylvania
Townships in Pennsylvania